Ladislav Ankert (born 1902, died between 1940 and 1943) was a Czech water polo player. He competed in the men's tournament at the 1924 Summer Olympics.

References

External links
 

1902 births
1940s deaths
Czechoslovak male water polo players
Olympic water polo players of Czechoslovakia
Water polo players at the 1924 Summer Olympics
Place of birth missing